Marttila is a neighbourhood located in Pitäjänmäki, Western Helsinki, Finland.

, Marttila has 357 inhabitants living in a 0.38 km2 area. It is neighboured by Pitäjänmäen teollisuusalue, Reimarla and Lassila

References

Pitäjänmäki